Siliguri subdivision is a subdivision of the Darjeeling district in the state of West Bengal, India.

Subdivisions
Darjeeling district is divided into the following administrative subdivisions:

Police stations
Police stations in the Siliguri subdivision have the following features and jurisdiction:

.**The total length of border with Bihar is

Gram panchayats
Gram panchayats in Siliguri subdivision are :

Naxalbari block consists of 6 gram panchayats, viz. Naxalbari, Uttar Bagdogra, Dakshin Bagdogra, Gossaipur, Hatighisa, and Maniram.
Phansidewa block consists of 7 gram panchayats, viz. Phansidewa-Bansgoan, Chathat-Bansgaon, Bidhannagar-I, Bidhannagar-II, Ghospukur, Jalas-Nijamtara, and Hetmuri-Singhijhora.
Kharibari block consists of 4 gram panchayats, viz. Kharibari-Panishali, Raniganj-Panishali, Binnabari, and Buraganj.
Matigara block consist of 5 gram panchayats, viz. Atharakhai, Champasari, Matigara I, Matigara II and Patharghata.

Blocks
Community development blocks in Siliguri subdivision are:

Demographics

According to the 2011 census, Hindus numbered 803,888 and formed 82.78% of the population. Muslims numbered 91,478 and formed 9.42% of the population. Christians numbered 61,477 and formed 6.33% of the population. Buddhists numbered 7,534 and formed 0.78% of the population. Others numbered 6,733 and formed 0.69% of the population.

Education
Given in the table below (data in numbers) is a comprehensive picture of the education scenario in Darjeeling district, with data for the year 2012-13.

Note: Primary schools include junior basic schools; middle schools, high schools and higher secondary schools include madrasahs; technical schools include junior technical schools, junior government polytechnics, industrial technical institutes, industrial training centres, nursing training institutes etc.; technical and professional colleges include engineering colleges, medical colleges, para-medical institutes, management colleges, teachers training and nursing training colleges, law colleges, art colleges, music colleges etc. Special and non-formal education centres include sishu siksha kendras, madhyamik siksha kendras, centres of Rabindra mukta vidyalaya, recognised Sanskrit tols, institutions for the blind and other handicapped persons, Anganwadi centres, reformatory schools etc.

Educational institutions
The following institutions are located in Siliguri subdivision:
University of North Bengal was established at Raja Rammohunpur in 1962.
Siliguri College was established in 1950 at Siliguri.
Siliguri Mahila Mahabidyalaya was established at Siiguri in 1981.
Acharya Prafulla Chandra Roy Government College was established in 2010 at Siliguri.
Siliguri College of Commerce was established at Siliguri in 1962.
Munshi Premchand Mahavidyalaya was established in 2008 at Siliguri.
Gyan Jyoti College was established in 2005 at Siliguri.
Kalipada Ghosh Tarai Mahavidyalaya was established at Uttar Bagdogra in 1988.
Nakshalbari College was established in 2008 at Naxalbari.
Indian Institute of Legal Studies was established in 2009 at Siliguri.
North Bengal Medical College was established in 1968 at Shushrut Nagar. 
North Bengal Dental College was established in 1990 at Shushrut Nagar.

Healthcare
The table below (all data in numbers) presents an overview of the medical facilities available and patients treated in the hospitals, health centres and sub-centres in 2013 in Darjeeling district, with data for the year 2012-13.:

.* Excluding nursing homes.

Medical facilities
Medical facilities in Siliguri subdivision are as follows:

Hospitals: (Name, location, beds) 
North Bengal Medical College and Hospital, Shushrut Nagar, 589 beds
North Bengal Dental College, Shushrut Nagar (OPD only)
Siliguri District Hospital, Siliguri, 320 beds
BSF Hospital, Kadamtala, Siliguri, 50 beds

Rural Hospitals: (Name, CD block, location, beds)
Naxalbari Rural Hospital, Naxalbari CD block, Naxalbari, 50 beds
Kharibari Rural Hospital, Kharibari CD block, Kharibari, 34 beds
Phansidewa Rural Hospital, Phansidewa CD block, Phansidewa, 30 beds

Block Primary Health Centres: (Name, CD block, location, beds)
Matigara Block Primary Health Centre, Matigara CD block, Matigarahat, 10 beds

Primary Health Centres : (CD block-wise)(CD block, PHC location, beds)
Naxalbari CD block: Bagdogra (10)
Phansidewa CD block: Bidhannagar (10)
Kharibari CD block: Rangali (6), Batasi (PO Badrajote) (10)

Legislative segments
As per order of the Delimitation Commission in respect of the delimitation of constituencies in the West Bengal, the ward no. 1 to 30 and 45 to 47 of the Siliguri municipal corporation will constitute the Siliguri assembly constituency of West Bengal. The Phansidewa block and the Kharibari block constitute the Phansidewa assembly constituency. The three villages of Sitong Forest, Sivok Hill Forest and Sivok Forest under the Champasari gram panchayat of the Matigara block will be part of Kurseong assembly constituency. Rest of the area under the Matigara block and the area under the Naxalbari block will constitute the Matigara–Naxalbari assembly constituency. The Phansidewa constituency will be reserved for Scheduled tribes (ST) candidates. The Matigara–Naxalbari constituency will be reserved for Scheduled castes (SC) candidates. All these four constituencies will be part of the Darjeeling Lok Sabha constituency.

References

Subdivisions of West Bengal
Subdivisions of Darjeeling district
Siliguri